County Route 531 (CR 531) is a county highway in the U.S. state of New Jersey. The highway extends  from Woodbridge Avenue (CR 514) in Edison, Middlesex County, through Somerset County to Passaic Valley Road (CR 512) in Long Hill Township, Morris County.

Route description

CR 531 begins at CR 514 in Edison. It heads north, soon passing under New Jersey Turnpike/Interstate 95 (I-95) without an interchange. It has a partial cloverleaf interchange with U.S. Route 1 (US 1) before crossing over I-287. One ramp from southbound I-287's exit 1B provides access to CR 531 south. CR 531 continues north through a residential neighborhood. Known as Main Street, it proceeds northward into the borough of Metuchen. It has an intersection with CR 501 while passing through downtown Metuchen. It travels under the Northeast Corridor and Metuchen station while it later intersects New Jersey Route 27. CR 531 makes a short jog to the west where it becomes known as Plainfield Avenue, then turns to the north passing St. Joseph High School. It then turns west on to Park Avenue before turning to the north again.

It continues north through Edison and South Plainfield. The route passes near Putnam Park and intersects CR 602 (also the terminus of unsigned CR 509). It crosses into Plainfield, Union County traveling near Cedar Brook Park and Plainfield High School. County maintenance of the road ends at 9th Avenue in Plainfield while the city-maintained CR 531 continues northeast through downtown Plainfield along Park Avenue. In the center of the city's business district, it intersects Route 28 and provides access to Plainfield station. Upon crossing Green Brook into North Plainfield, Somerset County, county maintenance of the route resumes and the road name becomes Somerset Street. The mainline of CR 531 jogs to the east for one block at Pearl Street before turning northwest onto Watchung Avenue. However, Somerset Street is a borough-maintained alternate route of CR 531 which travels through the central business district of North Plainfield.

The two legs of CR 531 eventually reach US 22. Watchung Avenue and Somerset Street provide right-in/right-out access to both sides of US 22, however for through traffic along CR 531, an overpass located between the two legs of the route is used to cross US 22. Heading northwest, the two legs of CR 531 come together and the road heads through a water gap formed by Stony Brook through the First Watchung Mountain towards Watchung. In the center of the borough, CR 531 and CR 527 intersect at the Watchung Circle. CR 531 and CR 527 share a brief concurrency along Valley Road to the northeast of the circle before breaking off onto Hillcrest Road. This road heads north into Warren Township where it has an interchange with I-78 at its exit 40. The road reaching its northern terminus at CR 512 in Long Hill Township, Morris County within the community of Gillette.

Major intersections

See also

References

External links 

NJ State Highways: CR 531-544

531
531
531
531
531